is the 35th single by Japanese singer Yōko Oginome. Written by Natsumi Watanabe and Tetsurō Oda, the single was released on August 23, 1995, by Victor Entertainment.

Background and release
The song was used as the ending theme song of the Fuji TV variety show Hey! Hey! Hey! Music Champ. It was also used as the opening theme song of the Tokyo FM radio show My Life Music, which was hosted by Oginome.

"Ashita wa Hareru!" peaked at No. 29 on Oricon's singles chart and sold over 52,000 copies.

Track listing

Charts

References

External links

1995 singles
Yōko Oginome songs
Japanese-language songs
Songs written by Tetsurō Oda
Victor Entertainment singles